The 2017–18 NIFL Premier Intermediate League ran from 12 August 2017 to 4 May 2018. Dundela were crowned as champions, winning promotion to the 2018–19 NIFL Championship.

Teams
Twelve teams will compete in the 2017–18 NIFL Premier Intermediate League. Armagh City and Annagh United from were relegated the 2016–17 NIFL Championship and Portstewart were promoted as the winners of the 2016–17 Northern Ireland Intermediate League.

Stadia and locations

League table

Results

Matches 1–22
During matches 1–22 each team plays every other team twice (home and away).

Matches 23–27
During matches 23–27 each team will play every other team in their half of the table once.

Top six

Bottom six

Play-offs

NIFL Championship play-off
The eleventh-placed team from the Championship, Dergview, played the runners-up from the 2017–18 Premier Intermediate League, Queen's University, over two legs for one spot in the NIFL Championship.

Dergiew won 4-1 on aggregate and retained their position in the NIFL Championship with Queen's University remaining in the NIFL Premier Intermediate League.

References

External links

Northern Ireland
2017–18 in Northern Ireland association football